Madison Hu (born June 2, 2002) is an American actress. She is known for playing the role of Frankie Wong on the Disney Channel series Bizaardvark, and for her previous recurring role as Marci on the Disney Channel series Best Friends Whenever.

Early life
Hu was born in Longview, Texas, the daughter of Chinese immigrants. She has an older brother who was born in China. Hu moved to Southern California, where she started to work as an actress.

Career
Hu started her career as a child actress. By about age six, Hu already had a manager in the entertainment industry. Hu's first notable role was on the Disney Channel series Best Friends Whenever, playing the recurring character Marci. She was later cast in the leading role as Frankie in the Disney Channel series Bizaardvark. Following her role on Bizaardvark, it was announced that she had been cast in the science fiction film Voyagers; the film was released in April 2021. In April 2021, it was announced that Hu would co-star in an Indie horror film titled Night Shift, alongside Lamorne Morris and Phoebe Tonkin. The film will be directed by Paul and Benjamin China.

Filmography

References

External links
 
 

Living people
2002 births
Actresses from Texas
American actresses of Chinese descent
American child actresses
American film actresses
American television actresses
People from Longview, Texas
21st-century American actresses